Polyoxins are a group of nucleoside antibiotics composed of heterocyclic moieties containing nitrogen. An example is Polyoxin B.
Polyoxins work by inhibiting the biosynthesis of chitin.

References

Antibiotics